Eldo may refer to:

 Eldo (given name)
 European Launcher Development Organization (ELDO) predecessor to ESA (European Space Agency)
 Eldo, former name of the Neapolitan basketball club now called S.S. Basket Napoli
 The Eldo Centre, Eldoret Town, Kenya; a shopping mall, see List of shopping malls in Kenya

See also
 Eldos